Prissac is a commune in the Indre department in central France. Gaston Chérau (1872–1937), a writer and member of the Académie Goncourt is buried in Prissac.

Geography
The commune is located in the parc naturel régional de la Brenne.

The river Abloux flows west through the southern part of the commune, then flows into the Anglin, which forms all of its southwestern border.

Population

See also
Communes of the Indre department

References

Communes of Indre